Merete Van Kamp is a Danish born model turned actress and singer.

Van Kamp's first film role was in the 1983 espionage thriller The Osterman Weekend, directed by Sam Peckinpah playing opposite John Hurt. She was then chosen from 700 hopefuls  to play the lead roles of Princess Daisy Valenski and Dani Valenski in the NBC blockbuster TV miniseries Princess Daisy, written by Judith Krantz. In 1985 she was a series regular in the TV series Dallas, playing Grace Van Owen in the 1985–86 season.

She guest-starred in several episodes of Hotel and Remington Steele and has appeared in many feature films, including You Can't Hurry Love with Bridget Fonda, and Mission Kill, with Robert Ginty and Olivia d'Abo, directed by David Winters. She was the lead in Lethal Woman (with Shannon Tweed), The Most Dangerous Woman Alive, Poison Ivy: The New Seduction (the third of the four-film series), and Westbrick Murders with Eric Roberts.

From 1990–1994, Van Kamp recorded an album for EMI-France entitled Pleasure and Pain, produced by Frank Langolff, who composed seven of the nine tracks (the other two were Rick F. James compositions). Van Kamp plays in série De Syv Drab 2012.

Van Kamp is the founder of The Van Kamp Studio www.thevankampstudio.com in Paris, France, Formation de comedian et realisation de Film, currently writing a drama thriller series of ten episodes.

References

External links 
 
 Documentary (41 minutes) on DR1, Danish National talk radio
 Www.Thevankampstudio.com

Living people
People from Kolding
Danish female models
Danish television actresses
American television actresses
Danish film actresses
American film actresses
20th-century Danish actresses
21st-century Danish actresses
Year of birth missing (living people)